Tottington is a deserted village and civil parish in the English county of Norfolk. Any population at the 2011 Census was included in the civil parish of Thompson.

Name
Tottington means "farm/settlement of Tota's people" or perhaps, "farm/settlement connected with Tota".

History
Tottington has an entry in the Domesday Book of 1086. In the great book Tottington is recorded by the name of Totintuna, meaning "the town or settlement of Tota's people". The main land holder was Ralph FitzHelwin. The survey also states there are fifteen mares. Samson of Tottington was Abbot of Bury St Edmunds from 1182 to 1211, and Thomas of Tottington filled the same role from 1302 to 1311.

Evacuation
During the Second World War, the village was taken over by the British Army when it was incorporated into the Stanford Battle Area. The military ranges were needed to prepare Allied infantry for Operation Overlord, the invasion of Normandy in 1944. Though some villagers were said to be happy to give up their homes to help the British war effort, the majority were less than enthusiastic with a number of heated village meetings and some refusing to leave the area. This was the subject of a book written by Lucilla Reeve, one such person who refused to leave, under the pseudonym A Norfolk Woman called Farming, on a Battle Ground.

However, at the end of the war, the former villagers were never allowed to return to their homes by the War Office. Most of the inhabitants of Tottington rented their houses and farmed the land belonging to the Walsingham estates. Though they had been promised that they could return to their homes after the war, the government later reneged on the promise and bought the land, threatening Walsingham with a compulsory purchase order. As the majority of the inhabitants were not landowners, they received very little in compensation, were put into council housing and many lost their livelihoods. They continued to fight for many years to return to their homes and farmland but the beginnings of the Cold War and the need for dedicated training areas removed all chances of a return.

Since the evacuation, the village and its parish remain within the Ministry of Defence's Stanford Training Area. Access is not permitted without special permission.

The Parish Church of St Andrew
The church is situated at the northern end of the village. The roof of the church is clad in blast-proof sheeting which was installed to protect the structure of the church. The original pantiles are stored inside the church ready to be restored if the village is given back to the public. The churchyard is surrounded by wire fencing to protect the church from the military manoeuvres.

In October 2009, a World War II veteran who had been born in the village was buried in St Andrew's churchyard after permission for the interment was granted by the Ministry of Defence. It was the first burial in the churchyard for more than fifty years.

Governance
For the purposes of local government, the parish falls within the district of Breckland.

References

 Ordnance Survey (1999). OS Explorer Map 229 - Thetford in the Brecks. .
 Rootsweb.com (1998–2006). Ghost Towns/Deserted Villages of Great Britain. Retrieved 17 February 2006.
 Office for National Statistics & Norfolk County Council (2001). Census population and household counts for unparished urban areas and all parishes. Retrieved 2 December 2005.

External links

Information from Genuki Norfolk on Tottington.
Information from NorfolkChurches.co.uk on the Stanford Battle Area and its deserted villages and churches.

Former populated places in Norfolk
Villages in Norfolk
Breckland District
Ghost towns in England
Civil parishes in Norfolk
Forcibly depopulated communities in the United Kingdom during World War II
Forcibly depopulated communities in the United Kingdom